In meteorology, rapid intensification is a situation where a tropical cyclone intensifies dramatically in a short period of time. The United States National Hurricane Center defines rapid intensification as an increase in the maximum sustained winds of a tropical cyclone of at least  in a 24-hour period.

Necessary conditions

External
In order for rapid intensification to occur, several conditions must be in place. Water temperatures must be extremely warm (near or above ), and water of this temperature must be sufficiently deep such that waves do not churn deeper cooler waters up to the surface. Wind shear must be low; when wind shear is high, the convection and circulation in the cyclone will be disrupted. Dry air can also limit the strengthening of tropical cyclones.

Internal
Usually, an anticyclone in the upper layers of the troposphere above the storm must also be present for extremely low surface pressures to develop. This is because air must be converging towards the low pressure at the surface, which then forces the air to rise very rapidly in the eyewall of the storm. Due to conservation of mass, this requires a divergence of wind at the top of the troposphere. This process is aided by an upper-level anticyclone which helps efficiently channel this air away from the cyclone. Hot towers have been implicated in tropical cyclone rapid intensification, though they have diagnostically seen varied impacts across basins.

Previous nomenclature and definitions
Currently it is defined as an increase in the maximum sustained winds of a tropical cyclone of at least  in a 24-hour period.
However, recent research suggests that mean sea level pressure is a better predictor of damage from hurricanes making landfall in the continental United States.

Forecasting
The later half of the 21st century forecasts envision stronger greenhouse gas forcing dominating natural variability which along with warming sea surface temperatures will create more intense hurricanes along the U.S. Atlantic coasts. The same period forecasts for the Gulf of Mexico coasts indicate sufficient wind shear in place to somewhat diminish rapid storm intensification. Atlantic storms, Hurricane Maria and Hurricane Harvey intensified rapidly in 2017.

See also

Tropical cyclone
List of the most intense tropical cyclones
Explosive cyclogenesis
Annular tropical cyclone

References

Tropical cyclone meteorology
Weather hazards